Inu or INU may refer to:
 Krisnan Inu (born 1987), New Zealand professional rugby league
 Irbid National University, Jordan
 Incheon National University, South Korea
 International Network of Universities
 Nauru International Airport, the sole airport on the island of the Republic of Nauru
 Inertial Navigation Unit